Paola (Paola Margherita Giuseppina Maria Antonia Consiglia; née Donna Paola Ruffo di Calabria; born 11 September 1937) is a member of the Belgian royal family who was Queen of the Belgians during the reign of her husband, King Albert II, from 9 August 1993 to 21 July 2013.

Early life and family background
Paola Margherita Maria-Antonia Consiglia Ruffo di Calabria was born in Forte dei Marmi, Tuscany, Italy, the seventh and youngest child of Fulco, Prince Ruffo di Calabria, 6th Duke of Guardia Lombarda  (1884–1946), who was a World War I Italian flying ace. Her mother was Donna Luisa Gazelli dei Conti di Rossana e di Sebastiano (1896–1989), a matrilineal descendant of the Marquis de Lafayette, a hero of the American Revolution. She is predominantly of Italian and French ancestry, with a dash of Belgian, Dutch and German. In her youth, she was hailed as one of the leading beauties of Europe.

Queen Paola is fluent in Italian, French, German and English. Less fluent, and the cause of occasional criticism, is her Dutch, the mother tongue of nearly 60 percent of Belgians.

Marriage and family

In 1958, the Prince of Liège went to the Vatican to witness the coronation of Pope John XXIII. At a reception at the Belgian embassy, the Prince met Italian Donna Paola Ruffo di Calabria. "We were both shy, so we only talked a little.", Paola said later about their first meeting. Prince Albert later proposed marriage to Paola and she accepted. Their engagement was announced at the Chateau of Laeken in 1959. The couple married at St. Goedele Cathedral in Brussels on 2 July 1959. They have three children together: King Philippe (born 15 April 1960), Princess Astrid (born 5 June 1962), and Prince Laurent (born 19 October 1963).

The couple's marriage was in trouble by the 1970s and Albert fathered a daughter by Baroness Sybille de Selys Longchamps, named Delphine. Despite starting divorce negotiations at the time, the couple remained married, and reconciled in the 1980s, celebrating it with a new symbolic wedding ceremony.

Activities

Apart from her activities in the company of King Albert II, Queen Paola devotes her time to social issues mainly in the social and cultural sphere.

The Queen has demonstrated interest in the contemporary Belgian arts, visiting Venetian Biennale several times. She has acquired works of Jan Fabre, Michael Borremans and others for the Royal collection. The Queen has often met with such artists as Luc Tuymans and Dirk Braeckman.

The Queen takes a keen interest in the protection and preservation of Belgium's heritage. She makes numerous visits to cultural sites, from Beguine convents to early 19th century industrial facilities. Queen Paola is interested in both traditional and contemporary crafts, and takes every opportunity to encourage the exercise and teaching of craft professions.

Queen Paola keeps abreast of contemporary art and regularly supports major exhibitions and artistic performances both in Belgium and abroad. On the initiative of Queen Paola, contemporary artists have had the opportunity to design and make original works within the Royal Palace of Brussels.

In 1992, Queen Paola established the Queen Paola Foundation. The foundation focused on integration and training for young people. The foundation's activities are geared towards social integration, support for teachers at all levels of the education system and schools in socio-economically disadvantaged areas.

Queen Paola is an honorary chairman of the Queen Elisabeth Music Chapel and Missing Children Europe.

Health
In 2015, the court announced Queen Paola was taking "a period of total rest" following doctors' orders. They also announced that she had to cancel a planned visit to the Biennale in Venice. Further communications were kept private. The Queen sent a message to Grosio, where she was expected to visit the residence of her aunt the Marchioness Margherita Pallavicini Mossi. Newspapers believed that the Queen suffered a stroke during the holiday. The palace later announced she was being treated for a cardiac arrhythmia. In 2016, she fractured a vertebra and in the following year she suffered from a fractured femoral neck and broke her hip. In September 2018, her visit to Venice was cut short and she was flown to a hospital in Belgium due to what was described by the palace as a "health problem", though some outlets speculated that she had suffered a stroke. In March 2022, she was ordered to rest for two months after breaking her arm in a fall.

Titles, styles, honours and arms

Titles and styles
 11 September 1937 – 2 July 1959: Donna Paola Ruffo di Calabria
 2 July 1959 – 9 August 1993: Her Royal Highness The Princess of Liège 
 9 August 1993 – 21 July 2013: Her Majesty The Queen of the Belgians 
 21 July 2013 – present: Her Majesty Queen Paola of Belgium

Honours

National
: Grand Cross of the Order of Merit of the Italian Republic
: Dame Grand Cross with Collar of the Order of the Holy Sepulchre
: Dame of the Decoration of Honour
: Dame Grand Cross of Obedience of the Sovereign Military Order of Malta
: Knight Grand Cordon of the Order of Leopold

Foreign
: Grand Cross of the Order of Honour for Services to the Republic of Austria, 1st Class
: Grand Cross of the Order of the Balkan Mountains
: Knight of the Order of the Elephant
: Grand Cross of the Order of the Cross of Terra Mariana
: Grand Cross of the Order of the White Rose
: Grand Cross of the Order of National Merit
: Grand Cross Special Class of the Order of Merit of the Federal Republic of Germany
: Paulownia Dame Grand Cordon of the Order of the Precious Crown
: Grand Cross of the Order of the Three Stars
: Grand Cross of the Order of Vytautas the Great
: Dame Grand Cross of the Order of the Gold Lion of the House of Nassau
: Dame Grand Cross of the Order of the Netherlands Lion
: Dame Grand Cross of the Order of the House of Orange
: Recipient of the Wedding Medal of Princess Beatrix, Princess of Orange and Claus Van Amsberg
: Grand Cross of the Order of the White Eagle
: Grand Cross of the Order of Christ
: Grand Cross of the Order of the Star of Romania
: Dame Grand Cross of the Order of Charles III
: Member Grand Cross of the Royal Order of the Seraphim
: Recipient of the Commemorative 50th Birthday Medal of King Carl XVI Gustaf

Arms

Ancestry

See also
 Queen Paola Foundation
 The Queen's Charities

Note

References

External links

Biography on the official Belgian monarchy web site

1937 births
Living people
Belgian queens consort
Italian nobility
People from Forte dei Marmi
Belgian people of Italian descent
Naturalised citizens of Belgium
House of Saxe-Coburg and Gotha (Belgium)
Belgian princesses
Knights Grand Cross of the Order of Merit of the Italian Republic
Members of the Order of the Holy Sepulchre
Recipients of the Grand Decoration with Sash for Services to the Republic of Austria
Recipients of the Order of the Cross of Terra Mariana, 1st Class
Grand Crosses Special Class of the Order of Merit of the Federal Republic of Germany
Dames of Malta
Grand Cordons of the Order of the Precious Crown
Grand Crosses of the Order of Vytautas the Great
Grand Crosses of the Order of the House of Orange
Grand Crosses of the Order of Christ (Portugal)
Grand Crosses of the Order of the Star of Romania
People of Calabrian descent
Polissena
Recipients of the Order of the White Eagle (Poland)
Princesses by marriage
Queen mothers